The Mystery Girl is a lost 1918 American drama silent film directed by William C. deMille and written by Marion Fairfax and George Barr McCutcheon. The film stars Ethel Clayton, Henry Woodward, Clarence Burton, Charles West, Winter Hall and Mayme Kelso. The film was released on December 22, 1918, by Paramount Pictures.

Plot

Cast

Ethel Clayton as Countess Therese
Henry Woodward as Capt. Thomas K. Barnes
Clarence Burton as Prince Ugo
Charles West as Chester Naismith
Winter Hall as Prince Sebasatian	
Mayme Kelso as Merecedes Thackery
J. Parks Jones as Ferdust

References

External links 
 
 

1918 films
1910s English-language films
Silent American drama films
1918 drama films
Paramount Pictures films
Films directed by William C. deMille
Lost American films
American black-and-white films
American silent feature films
1918 lost films
Lost drama films
1910s American films